David Lynn Russell (born July 7, 1942) is a senior United States district judge of the United States District Court for the Western District of Oklahoma and a former United States District Judge of the United States District Court for the Eastern District of Oklahoma and the United States District Court for the Northern District of Oklahoma.

Education and career

Born in Sapulpa, Oklahoma, Russell received a Bachelor of Science degree from Oklahoma Baptist University in 1963 and a Juris Doctor from the University of Oklahoma College of Law in 1965. He was in the United States Navy, JAG Corps, from 1965 to 1968, continuing to serve as a reservist until 1971 and achieving the rank of Lieutenant Commander. He was an assistant attorney general of the State of Oklahoma from 1968 to 1969, and was then a legal advisor to Governor Dewey Bartlett from 1969 to 1971. He entered private practice in Oklahoma City, Oklahoma from 1971 to 1972, but when Bartlett was elected to the United States Senate, Russell became his chief legislative assistant from 1972 to 1975. Russell was then the United States Attorney for the Western District of Oklahoma from 1975 to 1977, returning to private practice in Oklahoma City from 1979 to 1981, but again serving in the United States Attorney post from 1981 to 1982.

Federal judicial service

On December 4, 1981, Russell was nominated by President Ronald Reagan to a joint seat on the United States District Court for the Eastern District of Oklahoma, United States District Court for the Northern District of Oklahoma, and United States District Court for the Western District of Oklahoma, vacated by Judge Frederick Alvin Daugherty. Russell was confirmed by the United States Senate on December 16, 1981, and received his commission on December 17, 1981. On December 1, 1990, he was reassigned by operation of law to serve on only the Western District of Oklahoma, where he served as Chief Judge from 1994 to 2001. He assumed senior status on July 7, 2013.

References

Sources
 

|-

|-

1942 births
Living people
Judges of the United States District Court for the Northern District of Oklahoma
Judges of the United States District Court for the Eastern District of Oklahoma
Judges of the United States District Court for the Western District of Oklahoma
Oklahoma Baptist University alumni
People from Sapulpa, Oklahoma
United States Attorneys for the Western District of Oklahoma
United States district court judges appointed by Ronald Reagan
20th-century American judges
United States Navy officers
University of Oklahoma College of Law alumni
21st-century American judges